Rosières is a railway station located in the commune of Rosières-en-Santerre in the Somme department, France.  The station is served by TER Hauts-de-France trains from Amiens to Laon.

History
The station was destroyed during the battles of the First World War, and it was rebuilt between the two world wars.

The station used to be connected with Montdidier and Albert by secondary railway lines.

See also
List of SNCF stations in Hauts-de-France

References

Railway stations in Somme (department)